Wang Kai may refer to:

Wang Kai (actor): Chinese actor, also known as Nick Wang
Wang Kai (Former Shu): Chancellor of Former Shu
Wang Kai (footballer, born 1983): Chinese footballer
Wang Kai (footballer, born 1989): Chinese footballer
Wang Kai (Han dynasty) (王楷), an advisor to the Han Dynasty warlord Lü Bu
Wang Kai (born 1963): lieutenant general, the last commander of the former 13th Group Army, China
Wang Kai (politician), governor of Henan